is a Japanese former wrestler who competed in the 1984 Summer Olympics.

References

External links
 

1953 births
Living people
Olympic wrestlers of Japan
Wrestlers at the 1984 Summer Olympics
Japanese male sport wrestlers
Olympic silver medalists for Japan
Olympic medalists in wrestling
Medalists at the 1984 Summer Olympics
20th-century Japanese people